Thistledown is an unincorporated community in Ouray County, Colorado, United States. The community is located southwest of Ouray on Camp Bird Road (Co Road 361) between Ouray and Camp Bird

See also
Communities of Ouray County

References

External links

Unincorporated communities in Ouray County, Colorado
Unincorporated communities in Colorado